Allan Quatermain and the Lost City of Gold is a 1986 American adventure comedy film directed by Gary Nelson and released in West Germany on December 18, 1986, and in the United States on January 30, 1987. It is loosely based on the 1887 novel Allan Quatermain by H. Rider Haggard. It is the sequel to the 1985 film King Solomon's Mines.

The role of Allan Quatermain is reprised by Richard Chamberlain as is that of Jesse Huston by Sharon Stone, who was nominated for a Golden Raspberry Award for Worst Actress for this role, for which she lost to Madonna for Who's That Girl. The film also starred James Earl Jones as Umslopogaas, Henry Silva as Agon, Aileen Marson as Queen Nyleptha, Cassandra Peterson as Queen Sorais and Chamberlain's then real-life partner Martin Rabbett as Robeson Quatermain.

Plot
After surviving their expedition to King Solomon's Mines, Allan Quatermain and Jesse have settled down in colonial Africa. They are engaged to be married and Jesse plans that they will travel to America for the wedding. But Allan is restless.

A man chased by two strange masked men emerges from the jungle, and is recognised as one of Quatermain's friends. He is delirious and is cared for by Jesse and Allan, but at night, his pursuers return and kill him.

Before he dies, he tells Allan that his brother, supposedly lost, is alive, and that they have found the legendary 'Lost City of Gold'. Quatermain immediately starts preparing for an expedition to find his lost brother. Jesse is furious and stalks off, but then realises how important this is to Allan.

Allan and Jesse are assisted by Umslopogaas, a fearless warrior and old friend of Allan's, to put together an expedition. Swarma, a spiritual guru, and five Askari warriors, accompany them. The group crosses a desert and reaches the Walls of Japora; two Askari are lost when Swarma trips a boobytrap that opens a pit under the road to the city. Another member of the party is lost when savage Eshowe warriors attack the group. Many spears are thrown at Quatermain and his friends, but Umslopogaas deflects most of them with his giant axe. The remaining askaris are lost in a subterranean river.

Quatermain and his friends indeed discover the city. The inhabitants, both black and white, are friendly, and Allan meets his brother Robeson, seemingly in good health and at peace in the society. The city has two queens — the noble and beloved, Nyleptha and her power-hungry sister, Sorais. But the real leader is the evil High Priest, Agon, feared by all.

Allan raises the population against Agon and Sorais, who musters an army to recover the city by force. Allan realizes that they can make all the weapons they need out of gold, which is mined by the population. The final battle ends when, atop the temple, during a lightning storm, Allan uses Umslopogaas' axe to channel the lightning and melt the gold, causing it to flow off the side of the structure and pour over the attacking horde, turning Agon and his army into gold statues.

Cast
 Richard Chamberlain as Allan Quatermain
 Sharon Stone as Jesse Huston
 James Earl Jones as Umslopogaas
 Henry Silva as Agon
 Robert Donner as Swarma
 Larbi Doghmi as Nasta
 Aileen Marson as Queen Nyleptha
 Cassandra Peterson as Queen Sorais
 Martin Rabbett as Robeson Quatermain
 Rory Kilalea as Dumont
 George Chiota as George
 Alex Heyns as Dutchman
 Stuart Goakes as the trader
 Themsi Times as the nurse
 Philip Boucher as the bartender
 Nic Lesley as the toothless Arab
 Fidelis Cheza as the Eshowe chief
 Andy Edwards as Stand-in for Richard Chamberlain

Production
The film was made simultaneously with its predecessor, King Solomon's Mines, although it was released a couple of years later. Despite the tremendous liberties both films took with the source material, being more similar in tone to the Indiana Jones film series, Allan Quatermain and the Lost City of Gold was loosely based, mostly, on the book sequel of Haggard's King Solomon's Mines, entitled simply Allan Quatermain. In that book, which depicts Quatermain's last adventure (although it's just the second in the series of novels), the character and his associates go searching for a lost white tribe in Africa, and end up involved in a war between the rival queens of the kingdom.

An opulent set was constructed for the film just outside Victoria Falls.

Music
The film features just over half an hour of original music written by Michael Linn; for financial reasons, the producers reused material composed by Jerry Goldsmith for the first film (although Linn's score does use Goldsmith's main theme), supplemented with music composed for other productions from Cannon Films.

The score was initially released by Silva Screen in 1988 on a CD with cues from Manifesto (scored by Nicola Piovani), Making the Grade (Basil Poledouris), Doin' Time on Planet Earth (Dana Kaproff) and The Seven Magnificent Gladiators (Dov Seltzer); in 2009 it was issued on its own album by La-La Land Records. Cues in italics contain material composed by Jerry Goldsmith.

 Train Delivery/Don’t Fool With Quatermain (1:48)
 Quatermain Shows Off (1:53)
 Quatermain Meets Swarmi/Dumont Dies (3:20)
 The Ruse (2:53)
 Jessie Fingered (2:07)
 Umslopogaas (3:27)
 Earthquake (2:57)
 Quatermain Leaves Akawi (1:40)
 Worms (1:12)
 Love Scene (3:02)
 Agon Wants Revenge (5:04)
 Dumont's Gold City/Coda (3:11)

Release
The film debuted at number seven at the box office during its first week, earning $2 million.

It was a box office disappointment, one of several that led to Cannon Films reporting a loss in early 1987. The other box office disappointments for the company included Assassination, The Hanoi Hilton, Over the Top and Street Smart.

"I know it went through town pretty fast", said Richard Chamberlain. "I know my family didn't like it much. My father was too ill to see it, but my mother said, 'Richard, the advertising was all wrong. They should have told people it was funny.' But I don't think it hurt my chances for other movies. I know a lot of people who do a lot of movies, and some of them are good and some of them aren't. Michael Caine's one example. He's wonderful in some movies and forgettable in others. I think as long as you're doing generally good work that you enjoy, things will be okay."

Reception
According to Rotten Tomatoes, the film has received two positive and one negative review.

The Boston Globe film critic wrote " there's nothing new under the broiling afternoon sun. It's the same: washed-out scenery, stale dialogue and lackluster performances... Except for the presence of James Earl Jones doing a depressing turn as a native chieftain, "Allan Quatermain" is just for folks who don't mind mining for fool's gold." The New York Times said the film was "of minor academic interest. Those who take the Spielberg special effects for granted are sure to learn a lot by watching these same tricks done badly... Fortunately, Richard Chamberlain is professional and then some, since the film would otherwise be virtually unwatchable." The Los Angeles Times said the "movie seems largely aimed at fans who can't wait for the next installment of "Raiders of the Lost Ark."  Unfortunately, most of the battle scenes were... ineptly staged... Chamberlain has none of the breezy, irreverence that made Harrison Ford's Indiana Jones such a delightful hero. In his Banana Republic khaki duds and a bullet-proof undershirt, he exudes the dashing spirit of a game-show host. The rest of the cast is good largely for unintentional laughs."

Criticism of racism
Based on a 19th-century novel that, though progressive for its time, reflected some racist attitudes, the film itself has been criticized for conveying some of these same racist themes. The book Africans and the Politics of Popular Culture provides a harsh critique saying it reached "levels of racism unachieved since the 1930s." Though the film has been portrayed as a comedy and a satire not all critics have been satisfied that the racist themes are excused under this pretense.

Abandoned sequels
The Cannon Group originally planned a trilogy of films, the third film to be an adaptation of She and Allan but this was ultimately abandoned after the extreme negative reception of Allan Quatermain and the Lost City of Gold, coupled with the financial difficulties of the company at that time.

In 2011, a new sequel was proposed by Menahem Golan called Allan Quatermain and the Jewel of the East. The script was written by Golan and Richard Albiston and was to be directed by Golan himself. The plot concerned Quatermain attempting to rescue his daughter from Chinese treasure hunters in the Congo. According to the 2015 documentary Golan: A Farewell to Mr Cinema, Richard Chamberlain had agreed to return as the title character but Golan died before the film began shooting.

Home releases
MGM released the film on DVD on February 10, 2004.  A Blu-ray edition followed in March 2015.

References

External links
 
 
 
 
 
 Zone Troopers: Website about the different Allan Quatermain and King Solomon's Mine films

1986 films
1980s action adventure films
1980s adventure comedy films
American action adventure films
1986 fantasy films
American sequel films
1980s English-language films
Films based on British novels
Films based on works by H. Rider Haggard
Films directed by Gary Nelson
Films set in the 1910s
Films set in deserts
Films set in Africa
Films shot in Zimbabwe
Golan-Globus films
Treasure hunt films
Films with screenplays by Gene Quintano
Films produced by Menahem Golan
Films produced by Yoram Globus
1980s American films